John Wormley House, also known as the Valentine Hummel House, is a historic home located in Wormleysburg in Cumberland County, Pennsylvania. It was built about 1769 and is a -story, Log building with a tin roof, three bays wide and two bays deep. It has a two-story side frame addition.  It faces the US Highways of 11 and 15. It is in a half-Georgian style.  It was built by John Wormley, Jr., founder of Wormleysburg.

It was listed on the National Register of Historic Places in 1976.

References 

Houses on the National Register of Historic Places in Pennsylvania
Georgian architecture in Pennsylvania
Houses completed in 1815
Houses in Cumberland County, Pennsylvania
National Register of Historic Places in Cumberland County, Pennsylvania